Lamonzie-Montastruc is a commune in the Dordogne department in Nouvelle-Aquitaine in southwestern France. It boasts two primary chateaux. One is Le Château de Montastruc, an antique troglodytic site, then a fortress, arranged progressively through its 1500 years of history. Le Château de Montastruc is listed as a French Historical Monument. The other is Le Château de Bellegarde, originating from the 14th Century, although the interiors are of the 20th century.

Population

See also
Communes of the Dordogne department
Château de Bellegarde (Lamonzie-Montastruc)

References

Communes of Dordogne